EXO Travel, formerly Exotissimo, is a company which provides services to tourists in South Asia.  It was the first foreign company to be granted a tourism operating license in Vietnam. In 2015, Exotissimo has 20 offices and about 700 full-time staff.  Its head office is in Bangkok, Thailand, and it has sales offices in France, Germany, Australia, USA, the UK and Ireland and Latin America.

History
Exotissimo was founded in 1993 in Ho Chi Minh City by Eric Merlin, Denis Colonna and Olivier Colomes.  The company started by operating tours in Vietnam.

In 1993  EXO Travel was established by Eric Merlin, Denis Colonna and Olivier Colomès. being the first foreign company to be granted a tourism operating license in Vietnam.
 
In 1995 EXO partnered with local entrepreneur Su Su Tin and EXO Travel Myanmar, was born.
 
In 2000 EXO joined forces with a young Cambodian businessman, Meng Hieng and launched EXO Travel Cambodia, with offices in Phnom Penh and Siem Reap.
 
EXO Travel Laos soon followed in 2001, as EXO teamed up with Duangmala Phommavong and established offices in Vientiane, Luang Prabang and Pakse.
 
In 2002, growing interest in EXO's signature travel style was met with the opening of an office in Spain.
 
In 2003 EXO struck a deal with Hamish Keith, a Thai-based tour operator and gained a foothold in the Kingdom, EXO Thailand was established.
 
To meet rising demand from North America, EXO opened a sales office in the US in 2004.
 
To better serve growing markets, sales offices were opened in Australia and Germany in 2008.
 
In 2009 EXO Indonesia was established in partnership with Erik Meriot and Trisna Agustini to become the 7th destination.
 
In 2011 EXO expanded outside of Southeast Asia, launching EXO Travel Japan with offices in Tokyo and Kyoto.
 
In 2012 EXO launched its 8th and largest destination, EXO China with an office in Beijing in partnership with the husband and wife team of Olivier Marchesin and Susan Zhong.
 
In 2012 EXO established sales offices in London and Brazil to serve the UK/Ireland and Latin American markets respectively.
 
In 2014 it was time for a brand new look and Exotissimo became EXO Travel as part of a complete rebrand of the company to better reflect who EXO is now and the future direction of the company. 
 
In 2015 EXO Malaysia launched and provides a perfect opportunity to enhance offerings and service the niche markets it operates in.
 
In 2016 EXO Travel received the much-coveted Travelife certification in recognition of its long-term commitment and pioneering role in sustainability and corporate, social and environmental responsibility in Asia. 5 destinations are now Travelife certified: Cambodia, Vietnam, Myanmar, Thailand and Laos 
 
EXO’s tenth destination was launched with the office in Singapore in 2017. Focusing on MICE and group travel at first, but implementing FIT requests by the end of the year. 
 
EXO Travel Indonesia becomes Travellife certified in 2018. 
In 2020 EXO Japan and EXO Malaysia become Travelife certified
 
Although operations have been impacted by COVID, EXO Travel expects to recover by 2022.

References 

Transport companies established in 1993
Travel and holiday companies of Thailand
Companies based in Bangkok